Vipin Singh (born 21 October 1993) is an Indian cricketer. He made his List A debut for Services in the 2016–17 Vijay Hazare Trophy on 25 February 2017.

References

External links
 

1993 births
Living people
Indian cricketers
Services cricketers
Place of birth missing (living people)